Tinn may refer to:

 Tinn, municipality in the county of Vestfold og Telemark, Norway
 Lake Tinn, Norwegian lake
 Eduard Tinn (1899–1968), Estonian actor and theatre director 
 Jack Tinn (1878–1971), English football manager
 James Tinn (1922–1999), British Labour Party politician
 Olev Tinn (1920–1971), Estonian actor

See also

 Tin
 Tinne

Estonian-language surnames